The New Egypt Formation is a Late Cretaceous (Maastrichtian) geologic formation of the Monmouth Group in New Jersey, United States.

Description 
The basal New Egypt is a massive clayey, glauconitic marl that closely resembles the Navesink Formation into which it grades below. Ammonites and other invertebrates found at the Spheno Run site correlate well with the middle Severn Formation of Maryland. Spheno Run has so far produced a remarkable number of vertebrate specimens, especially from marine reptiles, including: carapace elements from at least two species of turtles, Peritresius ornatus and Taphrosphys sulcatus; various bone elements from at least two species of mosasaurs including a sizable fragment of dentary bone from Prognathodon rapax and numerous shed teeth from Mosasaurus maximus.

Vertebrate remains also include material from sharks, particularly teeth and unusually large vertebral centra from an individual lamniform shark Squalicorax pristodontus, bony fish, and, rarely, dinosaurs. In addition to the vertebrate collection, Spheno Run also yields an abundance of invertebrate species including: twenty-two bivalves, seven gastropods, six cephalopods, and one each of echinoidea, porifera, and scaphopoda. It is rare to find such an extensive array of both vertebrate and invertebrate species within one horizon in New Jersey.

Other fossils 
Bivalves
 Cucullaea vulgaris
Cephalopods
 Baculites ovatus
Fish
 Leptomylus forfex
 Edaphadon mirificus
Reptiles
 Agomphus pectoralis
 Catapleura repanda
 Dryptosaurus aquilunguis
 Hadrosaurus minor
 Hyposaurus rogersii
 Mosasaurus dekayi
 Mosasaurus hoffmanni
 ?Hadrosauridae indet.
 ?Lambeosaurinae indet.
Hadrosauromorpha indet.

See also 
 Paleontology in New Jersey

References

Bibliography

Further reading 

  
 B. Stahl and D. Parris. 2004. The complete dentition of Edaphodon mirificus (Chondrichthyes: Holocephali) from a single individual. Journal of Paleontology 78(2):388-392
 W. B. Gallagher. 1993. The Cretaceous/Tertiary mass extinction event in the North Atlantic coastal plain. The Mosasaur 5:75-154
 W. B. Gallagher. 1984. Paleoecology of the Delaware Valley region. Part II: Cretaceous to Quartenary. The Mosasaur 2:9-43
 E. S. Gaffney. 1975. A revision of the side-necked turtle Taphrosphys sulcatus (Leidy) from the Cretaceous of New Jersey. American Museum Novitates (2571)1-24
 E. L. Troxell. 1925. Hyposaurus, a marine crocodilian. American Journal of Science 9:489-514
 G. R. Wieland. 1905. Structure of the Upper Cretaceous turtles of New Jersey: Agomphus. The American Journal of Science, series 4 20:430-444
 G. R. Wieland. 1904. Structure of the Upper Cretaceous turtles of New Jersey: Lytoloma. The American Journal of Science, series 4 18:183-196
 E. D. Cope. 1875. The Vertebrata of the Cretaceous formations of the west. Report of the United States Geological and Geographical Survey of the Territories 2:1-303
 E. D. Cope. 1870. Synopsis of the Extinct Batrachia, Reptilia and Aves of North America. Part II. Transactions of the American Philosophical Society, New Series 14:105-235
 E. D. Cope. 1866. [On the remains of a gigantic extinct dinosaur, from the Cretaceous Green Sand of New Jersey]. Proceedings of the Academy of Natural Sciences of Philadelphia 18:275-279

Geologic formations of New Jersey
Maastrichtian Stage of North America
Cretaceous geology of New Jersey
Sandstone formations
Marl formations
Shale formations
Shallow marine deposits
Paleontology in New Jersey